Muhammad El Majzoub   (born August 15, 1991) is a Syrian singer who, in 2007, won the second series of The X Factor, XSeer Al Najah,, the Arab version of The X Factor. He was 16 at the time.

He went on to sign with Rotana and released his debut album Hann Albi in 2008. He also worked with Alanoud Production. He has been singing since 2007.

Albums 
 Han Albi (Rotana 2008)

References

External links
Contestant page on official website

1991 births
Living people
People from Latakia
21st-century Syrian male singers
The X Factor winners
Contestants from Arabic singing competitions